Fırıldak Ailesi is a Turkish animated sitcom created by Varol Yaşaroğlu for the Star TV. It depicts the life of a Turkish family in a comical way.

Characters

Main characters

2013 Turkish television series debuts
2016 Turkish television series endings
Turkish animated television series
2010s animated television series
Star TV (Turkey) original programming